Pundits from Pakistan is a book on cricket by Indian writer Rahul Bhattacharya. It covers the Indian cricket team’s tour of Pakistan in the year 2004. While the book is largely about cricket, it also tells of how the tour had an impact that went far beyond sub-continental cricket in terms of the goodwill and sense of bonhomie it created between the people of the two countries, thereby encouraging peaceful relations.

Published in 2005, it was Rahul Bhattacharya's first book, and received wide appreciation within cricketing circles. In 2010 it was voted number four of the Ten Best Cricket Books of all time in The Wisden Cricketer. He covered the tour for The Guardian and The Wisden Cricketer.

Overview

India’s last full tour of Pakistan had been in late 1989, although the Indians had visited for three one-day matches in 1997. Pakistan had toured India in 1999, before sporting ties were severed by India because of growing political hostility. The tour of Pakistan in 2004 was a part of the ongoing peace process between the governments of the countries. The itinerary included seven One Day Internationals and three Tests.

The book progresses with the tour, providing detailed accounts of the matches and recounting the journeys and off-field encounters. It is illustrated with a number of colour photographs from the tour. The scorecards of all the matches played as well as the statistical records related to the tour are given at the end of the book. It includes a conversation with Intikhab Alam, the former Pakistani cricket captain, and interviews with Danish Kaneria, the Pakistani leg spinner, Sabih Azhar, Shoaib Akhtar’s first coach, Aaqib Javed, the former Pakistani fast bowler, Andy Atkinson, the English pitch consultant who had been hired by the Pakistan Cricket Board, Abdul Qadir, the former Pakistani leg spinner, and Sourav Ganguly, the Indian captain on the tour.

The book briefly traces the cricketing relations between India and Pakistan over the years through Bhattacharya’s conversations with cricketers, officials, and fellow journalists. It also alludes to politics and the historical relations between the two countries. Bhattacharya provides numerous accounts of Pakistani hospitality, narrating how taxi drivers and shopkeepers refused to charge fans that had come over from India. Peppered with deep insights and cricketing trivia, it is partly in the form of a travelogue and provides a fascinating account of contemporary Pakistan.

Critical reception

Pundits from Pakistan won the 2005 Vodafone Crossword Book Award. It was selected among the top ten books published about the sport of cricket in the year 2005 by the staff at Cricinfo.

Reviews

Mike Marqusee wrote of the book in Wisden Asia Cricket:

Marcus Berkmann wrote of the book in The Wisden Cricketer:

References

External links
 Book review at Cricinfo.

2005 non-fiction books
Cricket books
Books about Pakistan